People Just Like Us is the third live praise and worship album of contemporary worship music by Hillsong Church.

Making of the album
People Just Like Us was recorded live at the Hills Entertainment Centre by Geoff Bullock, Darlene Zschech and the Hillsong team. It has the first release of one of the most famous modern Christian worship song of all time, Shout to the Lord by Darlene Zschech.

The Majority of the songs were written by Geoff Bullock, Russell Fragar, and Paul Iannuzzelli.

Reception 

In December 1997 Norman Smith of Cross Rhythms rated the album as 2 out of 10 and described the video as showcasing "glitzy, good looking, manufactured, well dressed, designer, brand new hairdo worship" where "only the beautiful, the groomed and the young are on display". He opined that "Although the songs themselves are sung with a certain conviction ... no matter how it's dressed up, and this dog's dinner of an offering ... [is a] contextless collection of schmaltzy, Sydney soap song[s]".

Track listing
 "Introduction"
 "People Just Like Us" (Russell Fragar) - Lead Vocals: Debbie Steinhardt, Geoff Bullock & Darlene Zschech
 "Father of Lights" (Geoff Bullock) - Lead Vocals: Darlene Zschech & David Evans
 "In the Name of the Lord" (Bullock) - Lead Vocals: Geoff Bullock, Darlene Zschech & David Evans
 "You Rescued Me" (Bullock) - Lead Vocal: Rob Eastwood
 "The Power and the Glory" (Bullock) - Lead Vocals: David Evans & Darlene Zschech
 "Have Faith in God" (Bullock) - Lead Vocals: David Evans, Geoff Bullock & Darlene Zschech
 "Your Love Keeps Following Me" (Fragar) - Lead Vocals: Lucy Fisher
 "I Just Want to Praise the Lord" (Bullock) - Lead Vocals: Darlene Zschech, David Evans & Geoff Bullock
 "Longin' for Your Touch" (Paul Iannuzzelli & Tim Uluirewa) - Lead Vocal: David Evans
 "In the Silence" (Iannuzzelli) - Lead Vocals: Darlene Zschech & David Evans
 "Just Let Me Say" (Bullock) - Lead Vocals: Debbie Steinhardt & Geoff Bullock
 "Shout to the Lord" (Darlene Zschech) - Lead Vocals: Darlene Zschech
 "Faith" (Bullock) - Lead Vocals: Darlene Zschech, David Evans & Geoff Bullock

Credits
Worship Pastor
 Geoff Bullock
Music Director
 Russell Fragar
Vocals Director
 Darlene Zschech
Choir Directors
 Annabelle Chaffey
 Janine Bullock

Lead Vocals
 Darlene Zschech
 David Evans
 Geoff Bullock
 Lucy Fisher
 Debbie Steinhardt
 Rob Eastwood

Backing Vocals
 Lucy Fisher
 Gail Dunshea
 Deborah de Jong
 Debbie Steinhardt
 Steve McPherson
 Rob Eastwood
 The Hillsong Choir

Piano
 Geoff Bullock
Additional Piano & Keyboards
 Russell Fragar
Keyboards
 Paul Iannuzzelli
Guitars
 David Moyse
 Allan Chard
Bass Guitar
 Paul Ewing
Drums
 Adam Simek
Percussion
 Stuart Fell
Trumpet
 Mark Gregory
Saxophone
 Paul Iannuzzelli
 Jun Javier
Flute
 Jun Javier

Executive Producer
 Brian Houston
Producers
 Geoff Bullock
 Darlene Zschech
 Russell Fragar
Engineer
 Jeff Todd
Post Production & Mixdown @ Rich Music Studios

Assistant Engineers
 Frazer Stuart
 Phil Munroe
Mastered by: William Bowden (at Festival Records)

Front Of House Engineer
 Nick Asha
Foldback Engineer
 Heath Graham
Technical Director
 Cameron Wade

Photographer
 Victoria Hawkins
Artwork
 Chris Perry Graphic Design
 Asher Gregory

References 

1994 live albums
Hillsong Music live albums